The Every Beat Of My Heart Tour was a European concert tour by British singer-songwriter Rod Stewart to promote his album Every Beat of My Heart. The tour began on 26 June 1986 in Belfast and ended on 6 November 1986 in Brighton with the 64th performance.

Tour dates 

Rescheduled and cancelled shows

Set list 
 She Won't Dance with Me
 Hot Legs
 Tonight I'm Yours
 Tonight's the Night (Gonna Be Alright)
 Passion
 Some Guys Have All the Luck (The Persuaders cover)
 I Don't Want to Talk About It
 You're in My Heart (The Final Acclaim)
 Young Turks
 Infatuation
 (Sittin' On) The Dock of the Bay (Otis Redding cover)
 Love Touch
 Maggie May
 Every Beat of My Heart
 Da Ya Think I'm Sexy?
 Baby Jane
 Sailing (Sutherland Brothers cover)
Encore:
Sweet Little Rock and Roller (Chuck Berry cover)
Twistin' the Night Away (Sam Cooke cover)
We'll Meet Again (Vera Lynn cover)
Stay with Me (The Faces cover)

Personnel 
 Rod Stewart – vocals
 Jim Cregan – guitars, vocals
 Robin Le Mesurier – guitars, vocals
 John Corey – guitars and keyboards
 Charlie Harrison – bass, vocals
 Tony Brock – drums
 Kevin Savigar – keyboards
 Jimmy Roberts – saxophone
 Nick Lane – trombone
 Michael Chichowicz – horns

References 

1986 concert tours
Rod Stewart concert tours